Amaya Creek is a creek located Santa Cruz County, California, United States. It is part of the Soquel Creek watershed. The creek was named after two brothers who owned the land around it, circa 1860: Casimero and Dario Amaya.

References

Rivers of Santa Cruz County, California
Rivers of Northern California